Davis Airport  is a privately owned, public use airport in Linn County, Oregon, United States. It is located one nautical mile (2 km) south of the central business district of Gates, Oregon, a city in Marion County and Linn County.

Facilities and aircraft 
Davis Airport covers an area of 10 acres (4 ha) at an elevation of 1,028 feet (313 m) above mean sea level. It has one runway designated 7/25 with a turf surface measuring 1,940 by 50 feet (591 x 15 m).

For the 12-month period ending May 27, 2009, the airport had 1,000 aircraft operations, an average of 83 per month: 90% general aviation and 10% air taxi. At that time there were 5 aircraft based at this airport: 80% single-engine and 20% multi-engine.

References

External links 
 Aerial image as of July 2001 from USGS The National Map
 

Airports in Linn County, Oregon
Privately owned airports